John Beddoe FRS FRAI (21 September 1826 – 19 July 1911) was one of the most prominent English ethnologists in Victorian Britain.

Life
Beddoe was born in Bewdley, Worcestershire, and educated at University College, London (BA (London)) and Edinburgh University (M.D. 1853). He served in the Crimean War alongside David Christison  and was a physician at Bristol Royal Infirmary from 1862 to 1873. He and his wife were both friends with Mary Carpenter and they hosted what was said to be the first women's suffrage meeting in 1868. Invitees included a young Annie Leigh Browne.
Beddoe retired from practice in Bristol in 1891.

He was elected a Fellow of the Royal Society in 1873. In 1887 he was elected a member of the American Antiquarian Society. He was a founder of the Ethnological Society and president of the Anthropological Institute from 1889 to 1891.

He died at Bradford-on-Avon on 19 July 1911. He is buried in the northern section of Dean Cemetery in Edinburgh towards the western end.

Family
In 1858, he married Agnes Montgomerie Cameron (d.1914), granddaughter of Prof Alexander Christison and niece of Robert Christison. She was the sister of his friend Dr David Christison. He and his wife had a son and a daughter.

Works
Beddoe was a pioneer in making observations of living people, in particular of their hair and eye colours, which he believed to be valuable evidence of the origins of the British people. His essay The Origin of the English Nation won a prize offered by the Welsh National Eisteddfod in 1867. This was later expanded and published in 1885 as Races of Britain.

Beddoe gave the Rhind Lectures in 1891, on 'The Anthropological History of Europe'.

Notes

References
 

The Races of Britain: A Contribution to the Anthropology of Western Europe, Bristol and London, John Beddoe, J. W. Arrowsmith, Bristol & Trübnermm, London, 1885; republished by Hutchinson, London, 1971, .

External links

1826 births
1911 deaths
People from Bewdley
English anthropologists
Fellows of the Royal Society
Fellows of the Ethnological Society of London
English suffragists
Members of the American Antiquarian Society
Presidents of the Royal Anthropological Institute of Great Britain and Ireland
Fellows of the Royal Anthropological Institute of Great Britain and Ireland